Jonas (sometimes "De Jonas" or Hafkamp) is a hamlet in the Dutch province of Gelderland.

Jonas lies on the border of the municipalities Epe and Apeldoorn. Jonas is not a statistical entity, and has been placed by the postal authorities under Wenum-Wiesel and Vaassen. It was first mentioned in 1899 as Jonas (De), and is a house name. Between 1899 and 1918, a dairy factory was located in Jonas. The hamlet consists of about 20 houses.

References 

Populated places in Gelderland
Apeldoorn
Epe